John Lester Fluhrer (January 3, 1894 – July 17, 1946) was a Major League Baseball left fielder who played for the Chicago Cubs in .

External links

Chicago Cubs players
Major League Baseball left fielders
Baseball players from Michigan
Springfield Reapers players
Toledo Iron Men players
1894 births
1946 deaths